Bukreyevskiye Vyselki is a rural locality (a khutor) in Besedinsky Selsoviet Rural Settlement, Kursky District, Kursk Oblast, Russia. Population:

Geography 
The khutor is located 109 km from the Russia–Ukraine border, 24 km south-east of the district center – the town Kursk, 8 km from the selsoviet center – Besedino.

 Climate
Bukreyevskiye Vyselki has a warm-summer humid continental climate (Dfb in the Köppen climate classification).

Transport 
Bukreyevskiye Vyselki is located on the federal route  (Kursk – Voronezh –  "Kaspy" Highway; a part of the European route ), 10 km from the nearest railway station Polevaya (railway line Klyukva — Belgorod).

The rural locality is situated 24 km from Kursk Vostochny Airport, 114 km from Belgorod International Airport and 182 km from Voronezh Peter the Great Airport.

References

Notes

Sources

Rural localities in Kursky District, Kursk Oblast